Heussallee/Museumsmeile is a station on the Bonn Stadtbahn served by SWB lines 63, 66, 67 and 68 and KVB's line 16.

It is an important station in Bonn's Stadtbahn network as the station is used heavily by commuters who work in nearby offices. Close to Heussallee/Museumsmeile is World Conference Center Bonn as well as the headquarters of Deutsche Post DHL Group and Deutsche Welle and offices of the United Nations. Additionally, the second seats of office of the German president (Villa Hammerschmidt) and the German chancellor (Palais Schaumburg) are located there. The former Federal Chancellery is now used by the Federal Ministry for Economic Cooperation and Development as its main office.

Nonetheless, the station is also used by people interested in the arts and culture. Heussallee/Museumsmeile serves Bundeskunsthalle (Federal Art Exhibition Hall), Kunstmuseum Bonn (Art Museum Bonn) and Haus der Geschichte der Bundesrepublik Deutschland (House of the History of the Federal Republic of Germany).

Gallery

References

Cologne-Bonn Stadtbahn stations
Buildings and structures in Bonn